The Tibet Museum is the official museum of the Central Tibetan Administration's Department of Information and International Relations and is located near the main temple of the 14th Dalai Lama, Tsuglag Khang, in the Dharamshala suburb of McLeod Ganj. The Tibet Museum aims to disseminate knowledge of Tibetan history and culture while raising awareness of the occupation of Tibet and the ongoing human rights abuses committed by China. Established in 1998, the Tibet Museum now has a collection comprising over 30,000 photographs, a traveling exhibition, and a permanent exhibition that documents the Tibetan journey into exile across the Himalayan ranges.

The Tibet Museum's mission is to document, preserve, research, exhibit and educate the public on all matters related to the Tibetan history and culture. Initially named the Tibetan National Commemoration and Documentation Center, many different ideas were discussed before the final concept was agreed upon by the Central Tibetan Administration. On 30 April 2000, the 14th Dalai Lama inaugurated the museum in a ceremony attended by around 300 dignitaries and volunteers. The Tibet Museum presents Tibet’s history and visions for its future through texts, photographs, videos and installations.

References

Tibetan culture
Museums established in 1998
Ethnographic museums in Asia
Museums in Himachal Pradesh
Buildings and structures in Dharamshala